New Law Tenements were built in New York City following the New York State Tenement House Act of 1901, so-called the "New Law" to distinguish it from the previous two Tenement House Acts of 1867 and 1879. New Law tenements are distinct from "Old Law" and "pre-law" tenements both in structural design and exterior ornament.

Design 

Required under the New Law to include a large courtyard which consumed more space than the 1879 Old Law's air shafts, New Law tenements tend to be built on multiple land lots or on corner lots to conserve space for dwelling units, the renting of which is the money-making purpose of the structure. In the early 21st century, a typical Lower East Side or East Village street will still be lined with five-story, austerely unornamented pre-law (pre-1879) tenements and six-story, bizarrely decorated Old Law (1879-1901) tenements, with the much bulkier, grand-style New Law tenements on the corners, always at least six stories tall.

Aesthetically, the New Law coincided with the fashion for Beaux-Arts architecture. The fanciful sandstone faces, gargoyles and filigreed terracotta of the previous twenty years of tenement design gave way to the more abstractly classical, but extremely florid ornamentation of this historically informed and integrated, urbane, international and more grandiose Parisian style. Unlike the flat street wall of previous tenements, which maximized the space available to tenants, the street wall façade of the New Law tenement often features recessed indentations, sometimes curved, sometimes rectilinear, giving the impression that stylish appearance mattered to the designer and owner more than optimizing space. They also feature oval and arched windows—more expensive to produce and replace—heavy terracotta ornaments around the windows and often thin brick, again, more expensive to manufacture and to lay. They give an impression of opulence which belies their purpose, location and their inhabitants; many were built in the ghetto to make money on the housing of largely impoverished immigrants by packing several families into small apartments.

New Law tenements can be seen throughout Manhattan and especially in the Lower East Side and Washington Heights.

See also 
 New York State Tenement House Act
 Tenement
 Old Law Tenement
 The Tenement Museum

References

Further reading 
 Lawrence Veiller, "New York's New Building Code" Charities Review 9 (1899-1900), 388-391.
 Lawrence Veiller, "The Tenement-House Exhibition of 1899" Charities Review 10 (1900-1901): 19-25.  
 Robert W. DeForest and Lawrence Veiller, eds. The Tenement House Problem: Including the Report of the New York State Tenement House Commission, in two volumes (New York:MacMillan 1903) Volume I   Volume II

External links 

 The Tenement Museum
 The Architecture and Development of New York City: Tenements

Urban design
Residential buildings in New York City
Progressive Era in the United States
New York City Department of Buildings